Megumi Kurihara (栗原恵 Kurihara Megumi, born July 31, 1984) is a Japanese volleyball former player who played for JT Marvelous. She also played for the All-Japan women's volleyball team and participated at the 2004 and 2008 Summer Olympics. Her nickname is "Princess Meg" (プリンセス・メグ).

Biography
Kurihara began playing volleyball as a fourth grader. She plays volleyball out of the feeling that valley wants to become good at in Otsu Junior High School of Himeji, Hyogo Prefecture and, in June, 1998 that was an eighth grader, study abroad. The senior high school enters Mitajiri girls' high school (existing Seiei High School) of Hōfu, Yamaguchi Prefecture, and experiences three senior high school crowns of high valley championship in a first grader in an Inter-highschool/National Sports Festival of Japan/ spring volleyball match. She was chosen as a member of the Japan women's national volleyball team in the third year of high school.

In 2003, she joined NEC Red Rockets of the V league (Premier League). She won young eagle Prize in the black eagle flag meet in May of that year. At the World Cup in November 2003, she attracted attention with 19 years old combination with Kana Oyama. She participated in the 2004 Summer Olympics, the following year and achieved the fifth place winning prize.

In October 2004, she was dismissed from NEC red Rockets. The reason given was that "her style did not match valley-style of NEC". There was the rumor of the transfer to the Italian Volleyball League, but then she joined Pioneer Red Wings in November 2004.

The No.11 V league was not able to participate from a meeting rule that "the player who signed for a club after the start of a season cannot participate in the league match" for 2004-05 season. A pennant race plays a held black eagle flag meeting in May 2005 and contributes to team championship. After a meeting, she left the team during a little by opposition with the director Arie Selinger, but she came back to the team in the middle of August, and the No.12 V league participates from the opening game for 2005–06 years. She contributed to championship for the first time in two pioneer seasons greatly and acquired prize for best distinguished services player / serve / best 6.

In 2006, she was selected for an All-Japan women's volleyball team, but she was injured during a training camp and sent for the rehabilitation life in about a half year.

In June 2011, she retired from Red Wings.

On 11 July 2012, Okayama Seagulls announced that Kurihara will move from Kazan to the team next season.

On 2016, she was diagnosed with Cerebral venous sinus thrombosis, and lost part of the 2016-17 season, she rehabilitated successfully after a surgery where she had to learn how to walk again, she started playing on her club again. Finally, on 2019, she took the decision of retire and end her professional career.

Clubs 
 MitajiriJoshi High School (2000–2003)
 NEC Red Rockets (2003–2004)
 Pioneer Red Wings (2004–2011)
 Dynamo Kazan (2011–2012)
 Okayama Seagulls (2012–2014)
 Hitachi Rivale (2014–2018)
 JT Marvelous (2018-19)

Awards

Individuals
2006 - The 12th V.League MVP, Serve award, best 6
2007 - 2006-07 Premier League Serve award (New Record)
2008 FIVB World Grand Prix "Best Server"
2008 FIVB World Grand Prix "Best Scorer"
2009 - 2008-09 Premier League Serve award

Team
2006 - The 12th V.League -  Champion, with Pioneer.
2008 - Empress's Cup -  Runner-Up, with Pioneer.

National team
2003: 5th place in the World Cup in Japan
2004: 5th place in the Olympic Games of Athens
2007: 7th place in the World Cup in Japan
2008: 5th place in the Olympic Games of Beijing
2010 World Championship - Bronze medal

References

External links
 FIVB biography
 Kurihara Megumi
 Going Megu's Way - fan site
 World Grand Prix 2007

1984 births
Volleyball players at the 2004 Summer Olympics
Olympic volleyball players of Japan
Living people
People from Etajima, Hiroshima
Sportspeople from Hiroshima Prefecture
Volleyball players at the 2008 Summer Olympics
NEC Red Rockets players
Pioneer Red Wings players
Okayama Seagulls players
Japanese women's volleyball players